The 1908–09 Drake Bulldogs men's basketball team represented Drake University in the 1908–09 college basketball season. The team was led by third year head coach C.A. Pell. This was also Drake's second season as a member of the Missouri Valley Intercollegiate Athletic Association. They finished with a 1–4 record the previous season. Drake played its first ever home game, a 19–15 win on February 10, 1909, against Nebraska.

Schedule

Notes 

Drake Bulldogs
Drake Bulldogs men's basketball seasons
Drake Bulldogs men's basketball
Drake Bulldogs men's basketball